The 2005 Asian Women's Club Volleyball Championship was the 6th staging of the AVC Club Championships. The tournament was held in Ninh Bình, Vietnam.

Results

|}

|}

Final standing

Awards
MVP:  Li Shan (Tianjin)
Best Scorer:  Li Shan (Tianjin)
Best Server:  Amporn Hyapha (Sang Som)
Best Spiker:  Wang Li (Tianjin)
Best Blocker:  Lin Chun-yi (Chung Shan)
Best Receiver:  Kim Hae-Ran (Korea)
Best Setter:  Wu Hsiao-li (Chung Shan)
Best Digger:  Szu Hui-fang (Chung Shan)

References
Asian Volleyball Confederation
Awards

2005 Asian Women's Club Volleyball Championship
V
Asian Women's Volleyball Club Championships
V